The Last Monk is an Indian 2006 English drama film directed by Sudipto Sen with Rachna Shah, Sonam Stobgias Gorky, Jimeesh Gandhi and Cibila Martin  playing the lead roles.

The Last Monk premiered at the 2006 Cannes Film Festival and got special screening at Rotterdam Film Festival in the same year. The film was also show at MAMI Film Festival in Mumbai.

Plot
Married and satisfied with her married life. While pursuing her course of Philosophy she has to leave for Ladakh to complete her dissertations for Buddhist Philosophy. She meets the guide, a local Khempo- Monk. A relationship develops between them which is physical but not intended. Does her husband accept her? The film is open-ended.
Swapna, pursuing a course in philosophy, lives in New Delhi, enjoying life with her husband Pushkar, a successful IT professional. It's been only fifteen days when she has to leave for Ladakh to complete her doctoral dissertation in cultural Buddhism. Sonic, a local Khempo, is her guide on the trip. A relationship develops between the two.

Cast
Rachna Shah as Swapna
Jimeesh Gandhi as Pushkar 
Sonam Stobgias Gorky as Sonic 
Cibila Martin as Kimberlie
Vikrant Chandola
Op Dimri as Concierge 
Narendra Joshi as Hotel Manager 
Dheeraj Kushwa as Muraad 
Samsthan Lden as Administrator 
Papon as himself

References

External links

2006 films
English-language Indian films
Films about Tibet
Films about Buddhism
Ladakh
Tibetan-language films
2006 drama films
2000s English-language films